Kodai no Kimi (小大君, dates unknown, also known as Koōgimi) was a Japanese waka poet and noble from the middle Heian period. She is one of only five women numbered as one of the Thirty-six Poetry Immortals.

Many of her poems are in Japanese imperial poetry anthologies including Shūi Wakashū. There is some overlap between her personal poetry collection Kodai no Kimishū (小大君集) and Ono no Komachi's personal collection.

External links

 Kodai no Kimi's poetry online in Japanese

Japanese poets
10th-century Japanese women writers
10th-century writers
Year of birth unknown
Year of death unknown
Japanese women poets